Man's Ruin Records was an independent record label owned and founded by San Francisco Bay Area artist Frank Kozik. After the 1994 release of Man's Ruin's first record Experimental Audio Research (EAR): Delta 6 Kozik worked with artists whom he wanted to release. He also designed all of the sleeve-art for the releases. The catalog of Man's Ruin is vast--including relatively famous bands such as: The Hellacopters, Nebula, Kyuss, High on Fire, Entombed, Turbonegro, 13eaver, Queens of the Stone Age, and The Sex Pistols, and also less known bands such as: FuckEmos, Soulpreacher, Angelrot, and Los Cowslingers. The last record released was from Begotten.  The label was officially gone by 2002.

The label's slogan was "Empty Pleasures and Desperate Measures since 1994".

Operations
Man's Ruin did not make signed contracts with the artists that they released. Their operation was very open. Recordings were licensed for a time period of 2–5 years and all copyrights and publishing liberties were retained by the bands. Profits on releases were split 50-50 between band and label. The posters and album art from the Man's Ruin era are still very coveted.  The limited print vinyl are constantly rising in their value due to two factors: the majority of covers were screen-printed and numbered by Kozik and all records were released in editions of 5000 copies or less. The most sought-after records from the Man's Ruin catalog have consistently been The Desert Sessions records-- were released in highly limited editions on clear and colored vinyl. The CD versions of the first six volumes, as well as the rest of the entire Man's Ruin catalog have gone out of print with the demise of the label. Subsequent volumes of The Desert Sessions were released on Josh Homme's Rekords Rekords.

Man's Ruin specialized in producing and releasing limited edition 10" EP records. Often an album would be released in several different sets--such as the first release from Queens of the Stone Age in 1998-- which was released on Man's Ruin in three editions: 2500 black, 300 green, 200 orange/yellow. A subsequent pressing of 198 copies on blue vinyl was made independently by the band as a "tour edition". The vast majority of records released on the label were colored.

The label was distributed in the US and UK by Mordam Records then a brief and unsuccessful switch was made to RED Distribution-- which resulted in the demise of the label after a series of problems. Internationally it was distributed by Swedish distributor and record label House of Kicks. Unlike most releases in music today, the international releases from Man's Ruin did not differ from the domestic American releases. However, it was not uncommon for the cover of a vinyl release to differ from that of the CD edition of the release.

Decline and fall
The label became defunct after a series of distribution changes and problems involving the label having outgrown its original distributor. Man's Ruin also lost its lease at the height of the Bay Area Dot-Com boom and was shut down for a period of several months while attempting to relocate its offices. This combination led to its demise at the end of 2001. The label's website was shut down a few months later.  Internet users who wished to view the Man's Ruin website were simply greeted with the message: "sorry mansruin never paid their bill and their site is no longer here." "They also did not pay their poster-printing crew for all of their overtime work", read an edit to their Wikipedia page by disgruntled squids who used to work there..  All operations ended and licenses were returned to the various copyright holders in 2002.

Kozik stopped working in the music scene and went on to enter the field of designing Urban Vinyl.

Several bands such as: Fu Manchu, Turbonegro, Acid King and The Hellacopters who worked with Man's Ruin have re-released the albums they recorded with them independently or with other record labels.

See also 
 List of record labels
 Man's Ruin Records discography

References

External links
 FrankKozik.net
 FKozik.com
 Man's Ruin Discography
 Mansruin.com on the Internet Archive

Record labels established in 1994
Record labels disestablished in 2002
American independent record labels
Alternative rock record labels
Defunct record labels of the United States